Apteroleiopus is a genus of beetles in the family Cerambycidae, containing the following species:

 Apteroleiopus apterus Breuning, 1955
 Apteroleiopus jeanneli Breuning, 1955

References

Acanthocinini
Taxa named by Stephan von Breuning (entomologist)